São Miguel do Passa Quatro is a municipality in central Goiás state, Brazil.

Location
São Miguel is located in the Pires do Rio Microregion, at a distance of 112 kilometers from the state capital of Goiânia.
Highway connections from Goiânia are made by BR-352 / Bela Vista de Goiás / Cristianópolis / GO-139. See Sepin for all the distances.

It has boundaries with Bela Vista de Goiás, Cristianópolis, Silvânia and Vianópolis.

Climate
The climate is tropical humid with an average annual temperature of 21 °C. From May to October are the lowest temperatures, between 18 °C and 21 °C, with an average minimum of  9 °C to 13 °C.  The hottest months, from September to November, register maximum temperatures of 36 °C to 38 °C.  The annual rainfall is around 1,400 millimeters.
The elevation varies between 600 and 900 meters above sea level.

Political information
Mayor: Eleusa França de Melo (January 2005-January 2009)
City council: 09 members
Eligible voters: 3,033 (December/2007)

Demographics
Population density: 6.84 inhabitants/km2 (2007)
Urban population: 1,870 (2007)
Rural population: 1,810 (2007)
Population growth: a gain of about 1,000 people since 1991

The economy
The economy is based on subsistence agriculture, cattle raising, services, public administration, and small transformation industries.
Industrial units: 6 (2007)
Commercial units: 29 (2007)
Cattle herd: 32,400 head (5,400 milk cows) (2006)
Main crops:  rice, beans, manioc, guava, oranges, tangerines, corn (1,500 hectares), sorghum, tomatoes, and soybeans (11,000 hectares).

Agricultural data 2006
Number of farms:  524
Total area:  30,427 ha.
Area of permanent crops: 90 ha.
Area of perennial crops: 5,724 ha.
Area of natural pasture:  16,939 ha. 
Area of woodland and forests:  6,835 ha. 
Persons dependent on farming:  1,300
Farms with tractors: 69
Number of tractors:  105
Cattle herd:  127,000 head IBGE

Education (2006)
Schools: 5
Students: 1,040
Higher education: none
Adult literacy rate: 90.0% (2000) (national average was 86.4%)

Health (2007)
Hospitals: 1
Hospital beds: 20
Ambulatory clinics: 3
Infant mortality rate: 19.70 (2000) (national average was 33.0)

Municipal Human Development Index
MHDI:  0.767
State ranking:  45 (out of 242 municipalities in 2000)
National ranking:  1,413 (out of 5,507 municipalities in 2000)  For the complete list see Frigoletto.com

See also 
List of municipalities in Goiás
Microregions of Goiás

References

Frigoletto
 Sepin

Municipalities in Goiás